Im Tae-hoon (born September 28, 1988) is a South Korean relief pitcher who played for the Doosan Bears in the KBO League. He bats and throws right-handed.

Amateur career
Im attended Seoul High School in Seoul, South Korea. In 2006, he was selected for the South Korea national junior team that won the gold medal at the 2006 World Junior Baseball Championship in Cuba. Im pitched 5 shutout innings, struck out 9, and allowed only 2 hits to win over Panama in the preliminary round. He started another preliminary match against Australia, and allowed 2 runs over 4.1 innings.

Notable international careers

Professional career 
Im debuted with the 2007 Doosan Bears. In his first KBO season, he pitched 101.1 innings with 7-3, a save, 20 holds (the league's runner-up), 93 strikeouts and a 2.40 ERA. Im eventually won the Rookie of the Year award.

In July 2008, Im was named as a member of the 2008 South Korea Olympic national baseball team together with the fellow 2006 World Junior Baseball champion Kim Kwang-hyun. However, Im, who gave up six earned runs in six innings in his last five KBO games, also struggled during an exhibition game against the Netherlands Olympic team in Seoul on August 3, and on the next day he was finally replaced with Yoon Suk-min of the Kia Tigers by Team Korea manager Kim Kyung-moon.

Im finished the 2008 KBO season as a setup man with a 6-3 record and a 3.41 ERA with 6 saves, 14 holds (5th in the league) and 83 strikeouts (13th in the league) in 83 innings pitched.

In March 2009, Im earned a late slot on the South Korea national baseball team for the 2009 World Baseball Classic, replacing Hwang Doo-sung three days before the start of the WBC. Im, the youngest player on the Korean roster, appeared in 2 games against Japan and Chinese Taipei, and pitched 3.1 innings, allowing one run and five hits.

Notable international careers

References

External links 
Career statistics and player information from Korea Baseball Organization

Doosan Bears players
KBO League Rookie of the Year Award winners
KBO League pitchers
South Korean baseball players
2009 World Baseball Classic players
Asian Games medalists in baseball
Seoul High School alumni
1988 births
Living people
Baseball players from Seoul
Baseball players at the 2010 Asian Games
Asian Games gold medalists for South Korea
Medalists at the 2010 Asian Games